Americanoid was an anthropological theory presented by the Russian Vladimir Jochelson (1855–1937) that grouped together the natives in the Northwest Coast region of America and the natives in northeastern Siberia, due to their ethnographic and cultural similarities. Even though there are indeed unexplained cultural, linguistic, and ethnological similarities between these groups, the idea of the "Americanoid" is now discounted by most scholars.

References 

Historical definitions of race
Anthropology
Indigenous peoples of the Pacific Northwest Coast
Indigenous peoples of North Asia